Peter Golden may refer to:

Peter Allen Golden (born 1953), author
Peter Benjamin Golden (born 1941), historian